Sarah Harlowe (1765–1852) was a popular actress of the London stage around the turn of the 19th century.

Biography
Harlowe was born in London in 1765. Under the name of Mrs. Harlowe she made her first appearance on the stage at Colnbrook, near Slough, in 1787, removing in the following year to Windsor, where she met Francis Godolphin Waldron (1743–1818), and became his wife.

Stage life
Waldron was prompter of the Haymarket Theatre, London, manager of the Windsor and Richmond theatres, a bookseller, an occasional actor at the Haymarket and Drury Lane, manager of the Drury Lane Theatrical Fund, the writer of several comedies, and a Shakespearean scholar. Through the interest of her husband Mrs. Harlowe obtained an engagement at Sadler's Wells, where, as a singer, actor, and performer in pantomimes, she gained some celebrity.

She made her appearance at Covent Garden on 4 November 1790 in the Fugitive. She was the original singer of Down in the country lived a lass, the song generally introduced into Lady Bell. In 1792 she was at the Haymarket, whence she went to Drury Lane, where she sustained the characters of smart chambermaids, romps, shrews, and old women, and then removed to the English Opera House. At the opening of the Royalty Theatre, Wellclose Square, under the direction of William Macready the elder, on 27 November 1797, Mrs. Harlowe played in the musical sketch entitled Amurath the Fourth, or the Turkish Harem, and also in the pantomime, the Festival of Hope, or Harlequin in a Bottle. In 1816 she was playing Lady Sneerwell at Drury Lane.   Her husband died in March 1818, in his seventy-fifth year.

She was a low comedy actress, who without any splendid talent had such a complete knowledge of stage requirements that her services were most useful in any theatre. Her figure was neat, and she often assumed male characters. Her best parts were Lucy in the Rivals, the Widow Warren in the Road to Ruin, Miss Mac-Tab in The Poor Gentleman, and the old Lady Lambert in the Hypocrite. She, however, essayed the majority of Mrs. Jordan's characters, and played them with considerable success.

In 1826 she retired from the stage, having on 21 February in that year played Mrs. Foresight in the farce of John Bull at Drury Lane. She was one of the original subscribers to the Drury Lane Theatrical Fund, from which in 1827 she received an annuity of £140 per annum, which in 1837 was reduced to £112.

Death
She died suddenly of heart disease at her lodgings, 5 Albert Place, Gravesend, Kent, on 2 January 1852, aged 86, and her death was registered at Somerset House as that of "Sarah Waldron, annuitant".

References

1765 births
1852 deaths
Shakespearean scholars
18th-century English actresses
19th-century English actresses
English stage actresses